Abacetus angustatus is a species of ground beetle in the subfamily Pterostichinae. It was described by Johann Christoph Friedrich Klug in 1853 and is found in Malawi, Zimbabwe and Mozambique.

References

angustatus
Beetles described in 1853
Insects of Southern Africa